Costinești is a commune and resort in Constanța County, Northern Dobruja, Romania, located on the shore of the Black Sea, about  south of the county seat, Constanța. It consists of two villages: Costinești and Schitu.

Etymology
Costinești was previously called Mangeapunar until 1840 and subsequently Büffelbrunnen until 1940. In 1940 it was renamed to Costinești after Emil Costinescu, a former land owner and Minister of Finance. Between 1950 and 1960 it briefly held the name Dezrobirea.

Background and tourism
In the 1960s, it evolved from a small fishing village to a summer destination, most popular with young people and students. A hotel and several villa complexes were built in the Communist era, and featured varying degrees of style and comfort. Since the Romanian Revolution of 1989, some of them have been modernized, and private construction, especially to the north of the resort, has taken off.

The resort also has a small inland lake, around which there are several lodges.

Lying off one of the northern beaches is the shipwreck of the Greek cargo ship  (originally the UK refrigerated cargo ship Empire Strength). She was beached there in 1968 and is quite popular with tourists.

Nightlife is centered mainly around the two discos (Ring and Tineretului), in which, during the summer months, concerts are held nightly by the most popular bands from across Romania. Because Costinești is mostly frequented by youngsters, the atmosphere tends to be livelier than in the other Black Sea resorts.

Costinești is accessible by either rail or road. There are two CFR railway stations within the resort (South Costinești — Tabără, North Costinești), and the town is connected to the main E87 road which runs north to Constanța and south to the Bulgarian border.

At the 2011 census, Costinesti had 2,713 Romanians (98.65%), 3 Hungarians (0.11%), 13 Roma (0.47%), 8 Turks (0.29%), 13 others (0.47%).

Natives
 Dragoș Ser

Gallery

References

Communes in Constanța County
Localities in Northern Dobruja
Populated coastal places in Romania
Seaside resorts in Romania